Polski Herald was a Polish language supplement published within the Wednesday edition of the popular Irish tabloid evening daily the Evening Herald in 2006 and 2007.

The supplement began as a result of the increasing number of Polish speaking immigrants arriving in Ireland after the EU accession of ten new members on 1 May 2004.
The supplement seeks to support the increasing number of Polish nationals living in Ireland by providing local community information and news from home.

References

The Herald (Ireland)
Newspapers published in the Republic of Ireland
Polish-language newspapers